The Motorola MC10800 is a 4-bit bit-sliced processor designed by Motorola and introduced in 1979. It is implemented in ECL logic and is part of the M10800 family.

A clone of the MC10800 was manufactured in the Soviet Union under the designation K1800VS1. The Soviet 1800 series included other members of the M10800 and M10900 families as well.

References

External links 

 The MC10800 - Dieter Mueller 2012
 

Motorola microprocessors
Motorola microcontrollers
Bit-slice chips